Bijar Anjil-e Kachal Bon (also Romanized as Bījār Ānjīl-e Kachal Bon) is a village in Otaqvar Rural District, Otaqvar District, Langarud County, Gilan Province, Iran. At the 2006 census, its population was 33, in 10 families.

References 

Populated places in Langarud County